Maria Levushkina (born 18 July 2004) is a Bulgarian figure skater. She is a two-time Bulgarian junior national champion (2019–20) and competed in the final segment at the 2020 World Junior Championships.

Programs

Competitive highlights 
CS: Challenger Series; JGP: Junior Grand Prix

Detailed results 
ISU Personal best in bold.

Senior results

Junior results

References

External links 
 
 

2004 births
Living people
Bulgarian female single skaters
Sportspeople from Varna, Bulgaria